Cedar Station is a ghost town in Terrell County, Texas, United States.

History
The village was founded in 1947 by T.H. Eastman and family, and was composed by a wooden house and a gas station on the U.S. Highway 90. It was abandoned a few decades later.

Geography
Cedar Station lies 16 miles east of Dryden, 38 east of Sanderson, the county seat; and 12 west of the ghost town of Pumpville, in the adjacent Val Verde County. The Mexican border, on the Rio Grande River, is 12 miles south.

See also
List of ghost towns in Texas

References

Populated places in Terrell County, Texas
Ghost towns in West Texas